Matsumyia cyaniventris is a species of hoverfly in the family Syrphidae.

Distribution
Philippines.

References

Eristalinae
Diptera of Asia
Insects described in 1926
Taxa named by Pius Sack